List of bridges on the National Register of Historic Places in Washington may refer to:

 List of bridges on the National Register of Historic Places in Washington (state)
 List of bridges on the National Register of Historic Places in Washington, D.C.